Caio Vidal Rocha (born 4 November 2000), known as Caio Vidal, is a Brazilian professional footballer who plays as a winger for Ludogorets Razgrad.

Professional career
On 12 December 2020, Caio Vidal signed his first professional contract with Internacional. Caio made his professional debut with Internacional in a 1-0 Copa do Brasil win over América Mineiro on 19 November 2020.

References

External links
 
 Internacional Profile 

2000 births
Living people
Sportspeople from Fortaleza
Brazilian footballers
Association football wingers
Sport Club Internacional players
Esporte Clube Bahia players
PFC Ludogorets Razgrad players
First Professional Football League (Bulgaria) players
Campeonato Brasileiro Série A players